The 2016 Argentine Primera B Metropolitana was the 117th season of the third tier of football in Argentina. The season began on 13 January and ended in June. Twenty teams competed in the league.

League table

See also
 2016 Argentine Primera División
 2016 Primera B Nacional
 2016 Torneo Federal A
 2015–16 Copa Argentina

References

External links
soccerway.com

2016 in Argentine football